Herrera is a railway station in San Sebastián, Basque Country, Spain. It is owned by Euskal Trenbide Sarea and operated by Euskotren. It lies on the San Sebastián-Hendaye railway, popularly known as the Topo line. The Cercanías San Sebastián station  is located close to the Euskotren station, but the two are not connected.

History 
The station opened in 1912 as part of the San Sebastián-Hendaye railway. Originally it was a freight station.

The current station is part of the new alignment between Loiola and Herrera that opened in October 2012. The original single-track tunnel was replaced by a new double-tracked one, and a new station was built at Intxaurrondo. In September 2016, the branch from Herrera to  opened.

Services 
The station is served by Euskotren Trena lines E2 and E5. Line E2 runs every 15 minutes during weekdays and weekend afternoons, and every 30 minutes on weekend mornings. Line E5 serves the  branch, running every 15 minutes on weekdays and weekend afternoons, and every 30 minutes on weekend mornings.

References

External links
 

Euskotren Trena stations
Railway stations in San Sebastián
Railway stations in Spain opened in 1912
Railway stations in Spain opened in 2012
2012 establishments in the Basque Country (autonomous community)